The Radio Starmaker Fund is a private fund developed by the Canadian Association of Broadcasters with the approval of the Canadian Radio-television and Telecommunications Commission (CRTC).  It is a private fund that supports new artists with substantial investments in the careers of emerging artists.

Music organizations based in Canada
Radio organizations in Canada